C. Ernest Burton was the head coach of the University of Maine's football team in 1900 and compiled a 4–4 record.

Head coaching record

References

Year of birth missing
Year of death missing
Maine Black Bears football coaches